"I'm Sorry I Made You Cry" is a World War I song written and composed by N.J. Clesi. It was published in 1918 by Leo Feist, Inc. in New York, NY. The sheet music cover depicts a soldier embracing a woman.

The sheet music can be found at the Pritzker Military Museum & Library.

Usage in film

Alice Faye sang it in Rose of Washington Square (1939).

References

Bibliography
Parker, Bernard S. World War I Sheet Music 1. Jefferson: McFarland & Company, Inc., 2007. . 

1918 songs
Songs of World War I